The 2010–11 Liga Premier de Ascenso season was split in two tournaments Independencia and Revolución. Liga Premier was the third-tier football league of Mexico. The season was played between 27 August 2010 and 21 May 2011.

Teams

Group 1 
{{Location map+ |Mexico |width=700|float=right |caption=Location of teams in the 2010–11 LPA Group 1 |places=

Group 2

Group 3

Torneo Independencia

Regular season

Group 1

League table

Results

Group 2

League table

Results

Group 3

League table

Results

Liguilla
The fifth or sixth best teams of each group play two games against each other on a home-and-away basis. The higher seeded teams play on their home field during the second leg. The winner of each match up is determined by aggregate score. In the Round of 8, quarterfinals and semifinals, if the two teams are tied on aggregate the higher seeded team advances. In the final, if the two teams are tied after both legs, the match goes to extra time and, if necessary, a penalty shoot-out.

Round of 16

First leg

Second leg

Quarter-finals

First leg

Second leg

Semi-finals

First leg

Second leg

Final

First leg

Second leg

Torneo Revolución

Regular season

Group 1

League table

Results

Group 2

League table

Results

Group 3

League table

Results

Liguilla
The fifth or sixth best teams of each group play two games against each other on a home-and-away basis. The higher seeded teams play on their home field during the second leg. The winner of each match up is determined by aggregate score. In the Round of 8, quarterfinals and semifinals, if the two teams are tied on aggregate the higher seeded team advances. In the final, if the two teams are tied after both legs, the match goes to extra time and, if necessary, a penalty shoot-out.

Round of 16

First leg

Second leg

Quarter-finals

First leg

Second leg

Semi-finals

First leg

Second leg

Final

First leg

Second leg

Relegation Table 

Last updated: 10 April 2011 Source: Liga Premier FMFP = Position; G = Games played; Pts = Points; Pts/G = Ratio of points to games played

Promotion Final 
The Promotion Final is a series of matches played by the champions of the tournaments Apertura and Clausura, the game is played to determine the winning team of the promotion to Liga de Ascenso. 
The first leg was played on 14 May 2011, and the second leg was played on 21 May 2011.

First leg

Second leg

See also 
2010–11 Mexican Primera División season
2010–11 Liga de Ascenso season
2010–11 Liga de Nuevos Talentos season

References

External links 
 Official website of Liga Premier
 Magazine page 

 
1